Gharbi Rural District is in Samarin District of Ardabil County, Ardabil province, Iran. At the National Census of 2006, the population was 10,730 in 2,291 households, at which time it was in the Central District. The following census of 2011 counted 4,975 inhabitants in 1,389 households, and in the most recent census of 2016, the population had decreased slightly to 4,936 in 1,389 households. The largest of its seven villages was Samarin, with 2,326 people.

References 

Ardabil County

Rural Districts of Ardabil Province

Populated places in Ardabil Province

Populated places in Ardabil County